Pesotum may refer to:
 Pesotum, Illinois,  a village in Champaign County, Illinois, United States
 Pesotum (fungus), a fungus genus in the family  Ophiostomataceae